John Valcoulon Le Moyne (November 17, 1828 – July 27, 1918) was a U.S. Representative from Illinois.

Life and career
Le Moyne was born in Washington, Pennsylvania, the son of Madeleine Romaine (Bureau) and Francis Julius LeMoyne. Le Moyne attended the common schools. He was graduated from Washington & Jefferson College, Washington, Pennsylvania, in 1847. He studied law. He was admitted to the bar in Pittsburgh, Pennsylvania, in 1852. He moved to Chicago, Illinois the same year and commenced practice. He was an unsuccessful candidate of the Liberal Party for election in 1872 to the Forty-third Congress. He successfully contested as a Democrat the election of Charles B. Farwell to the Forty-fourth Congress and served from May 6, 1876, to March 3, 1877. He was an unsuccessful candidate for reelection in 1876 to the Forty-fifth Congress. He resumed the practice of law in Chicago. He retired in 1887 and moved to Baltimore, Maryland, where he resided until his death. He was interred in Washington Cemetery, Washington, Pennsylvania.

His wife, Julia N. Murray, was the daughter of politician Magnus Miller Murray. Le Moyne is the great-great-grandfather of actress Julie Bowen.

References

External links
 John V. LeMoyne Papers at the Newberry Library

1828 births
1918 deaths
Washington & Jefferson College alumni
Politicians from Chicago
Democratic Party members of the United States House of Representatives from Illinois
Pennsylvania lawyers
Lawyers from Chicago
19th-century American politicians
19th-century American lawyers